Martin Košťál (born 23 February 1996) is a Slovak professional footballer who plays as a midfielder for Polish club Sandecja Nowy Sącz.

Career

Spartak Trnava
Košťál made his Fortuna Liga debut for Trnava against Dunajská Streda on 19 March 2016.

Wisła Kraków
On 10 July 2017, he signed a contract with Wisła Kraków.

Jagiellonia Białystok
On 21 January 2019, he signed a contract with Jagiellonia Białystok.

References

External links

FC Spartak Trnava official club profile
Futbalnet Profile 

1996 births
Living people
People from Nové Zámky
Sportspeople from the Nitra Region
Slovak footballers
Slovak expatriate footballers
Slovakia under-21 international footballers
Association football midfielders
FC Spartak Trnava players
Wisła Kraków players
Jagiellonia Białystok players
FK Senica players
ŠKF Sereď players
SK Sigma Olomouc players
Sandecja Nowy Sącz players
2. Liga (Slovakia) players
Slovak Super Liga players
Ekstraklasa players
III liga players
Czech First League players
Czech National Football League players
Expatriate footballers in Poland
Slovak expatriate sportspeople in Poland
Expatriate footballers in the Czech Republic
Slovak expatriate sportspeople in the Czech Republic